Pyrausta tetraplagalis is a moth in the family Crambidae. It is found in the Democratic Republic of Congo (Katanga, Equateur) and Zimbabwe.

The wingspan is about 16 mm. The forewings are black with an orange subbasal band. The hindwings are black with an orange basal area.

References

Moths described in 1899
tetraplagalis
Moths of Africa